Avudari Venkateswarlu served as an independent Member of the Legislative Assembly for Vinukonda constituency in Andhra Pradesh, India, between 1978 and 1983.

References

Andhra Pradesh MLAs 1978–1983
Possibly living people
Year of birth missing